This article is a list of historic places in the City of Toronto, Ontario entered on the Canadian Register of Historic Places, whether they are federal, provincial, or municipal.

See also List of historic places in Ontario.

List of historic places 

Toronto
Buildings and structures in Toronto